Aap Neljas (born 16 August 1967 Tallinn) is an Estonian politician. He was a member of VII Riigikogu.

References

Living people
1967 births
Members of the Riigikogu, 1992–1995
Members of the Riigikogu, 1995–1999
Members of the Riigikogu, 1999–2003
Politicians from Tallinn